M90 or M-90 may refer to:

Military
 M90 (camouflage), a camouflage pattern used by the Swedish armed forces
 Zastava M90, a Yugoslav modern assault rifle
 Sanomalaite M/90, a Finnish communications device

Transportation
 Lotus M90, a concept car 
 M-90 (Michigan highway), a state highway in Michigan, United States
 M90 motorway, a motorway in Scotland
 McDonnell Douglas MD-90, a twin-engine commercial jet airliner
 Mendota Airport (FAA location identifier: M90), an airport in Mendota, California, United States
 Volvo M90 transmission, a gearbox for the Volvo 900 Series models of cars
 Mitsubishi SpaceJet M90, a regional jet aircraft

Other uses
 Barrett M90, a bullpup sniper rifle
 M 90, an age group for Masters athletics (athletes aged 35+)
 Messier 90 (M90), a spiral galaxy in the Virgo cluster
 Dell Precision M90, a Dell workstation notebook